Pablo Justo Forlán Lamarque (born July 14, 1945 in Mercedes, Soriano) is a retired Uruguayan footballer, the father of Diego Forlán, and son-in-law of Juan Carlos Corazzo. His mother was of Uruguayan and Spanish descent.

Career
As a professional footballer Pablo Forlán played for Peñarol (1963–1970), São Paulo FC (1970–1976), Cruzeiro EC (1977), Nacional de Montevideo (1978) and Defensor Sporting (1979–1984). During his career he helped win the Uruguayan league (1964, 1965, 1967, 1968, 1978, 1980, 1982), the Copa Libertadores (1966), the Intercontinental Cup (1966) and the São Paulo state championship (1970, 1971, 1975).

Pablo Forlán was also a Uruguayan international, who played at the 1966 and 1974 FIFA World Cups.

Titles
 Champion of Uruguay (4): 1964, 1965, 1967, 1968
 São Paulo State Champion (3): 1970, 1971, 1975
 Ligilla Uruguay Winner (2): 1979, 1981
 Libertadores Cup Winner (1): 1966
 Intercontinental Cup Winner (1): 1966
 Winner of the Intercontinental Champions' Supercup 1969

References

1945 births
Living people
People from Mercedes, Uruguay
Uruguayan people of Spanish descent
Uruguayan people of Basque descent
Uruguayan footballers
Association football defenders
Peñarol players
São Paulo FC players
Cruzeiro Esporte Clube players
Club Nacional de Football players
Defensor Sporting players
Uruguayan Primera División players
Expatriate footballers in Brazil
Uruguay international footballers
1966 FIFA World Cup players
1967 South American Championship players
1974 FIFA World Cup players
Uruguayan expatriate footballers
Uruguayan expatriate sportspeople in Brazil
Uruguayan football managers
Defensor Sporting managers
São Paulo FC managers
Uruguayan expatriate football managers
Expatriate football managers in Brazil